Sceliscelis is a monotypic genus of east African palp-footed spiders containing the single species, Sceliscelis marshi. It was first described by A. D. Oketch, S. Zonstein and E. N. Kioko in 2020, and it has only been found in Kenya.

See also
 List of Palpimanidae species

References

Monotypic Palpimanidae genera
Arthropods of Kenya